Aheu may refer to:

Aheu language
Aheu Deng